A Peça (Portuguese) (also), in Spanish  ("piece of India") was a unit of value during the 16th to 18th centuries used in the slave trade between the Spanish colonies in the Americas and slave traders operating from West Africa through the Portuguese Cape Verde Islands. A peça was used to measure quotas and to assess tariffs. Broadly speaking one peça equated to one healthy male or female slave between 15 and 25 years of age; slaves between 25 and 35, and between 8 and 15 years were valued at 2/3 peça with those outside this age range and those infirm being valued lower.

Background
The 1479 Treaty of Alcáçovas divided the Atlantic Ocean and other parts of the globe into two zones of influence, Spanish and Portuguese. The Spanish acquired the west side washing South America and the West Indies, whilst the Portuguese obtained the east side washing the west coast of Africa—and also the Indian Ocean beyond. The Spanish relied on African slave labour to make their American colonial project possible, but now lacked any trading or territorial foothold in West Africa, the principal source of slave labour. It is suggested by Scheider that the term originated in the number of cloths from India exchanged for a person in West Africa.

Definitions
1 person aged 16/18-35 = 1 ;
2 persons 12/14 - 16/18 = 1 ;
3 persons 6 - 12/14 = 2 ;

Sorsby states that the term  originated in the mid-17th century and referred to a "prime male slave in good physical condition between 14 and 30 years of age and about 4 ft 8 inches tall". It was thus a unit used to enumerate a cargo of slaves.

During British tenure of the 
This apparently profitable monopoly was re-granted by the British government to the South Sea Company, formed in 1711, as an inducement for the Company assuming liability for the public debt of the government. Previously the  had been held by the Portuguese and by Genoese, Dutch and French slave traders. It also provided for the imposition by the Spanish of an import tax of 33 1/3 pesos on each of the first 4,000 , the last 800 being duty-free.

Measurement process
On the arrival of South Sea Company slave-carrying ships at Spanish ports, the human cargo had to be inspected for health and measured by Spanish local royal officials for conversion from mere headcount into , in order that the import tax could be assessed and the terms of the  followed with regard to maximum volumes introduced (i.e. supplied). Slaves were not measured individually but in groups, using a special tape-measure divided into seven quarter varas, each  being about 33 inches, about one British yard; thus, one quarter  was  inches, seven quarters was thus 57 3/4 inches, in other words 4 ft 8 inches, equating to one . "Deductions were made for physical defects, such as filed teeth, missing limbs and tribal scars, as well as for women, children and old people".

One instance of such a company order has survived as follows: Obtain as much indulgence of the royal officers in the measurement of our negros as you can, the usual measurement is 3 for 4 but we would not here be understood that you should buy their favour, believing it will not answer to the Company, for we doubt the introduction each year of even 4,000 negros into the Spanish West Indies & until we exceed that number it cannot be of any advantage to the Company.

This so-called "right to indult" (from Spanish , 'pardon') illegal slaves was granted to the British under Article 37 of the  treaty. It provided much scope for private profit-making by corrupt company officials, as company factors (local managers) received a share of half of the net sale proceeds on resale of the slave, as an incentive to control illegal slave-trading activity, the other half going to the company.

Ratio
Use of such ratio provides data to historians and researchers attempting to estimate genders and ages of slaves introduced into different areas, actual headcount figures being unavailable.

See also 

 Slavery in colonial Spanish America

External links

References

Spanish slave trade
Spanish colonization of the Americas
British slave trade
Slavery in the Spanish Empire